The following is a list of ecoregions in Egypt, according to the Worldwide Fund for Nature (WWF).

Terrestrial ecoregions

Palearctic

Mediterranean forests, woodlands, and scrub
 Mediterranean dry woodlands and steppe

Deserts and xeric shrublands
 North Saharan steppe and woodlands
 Red Sea coastal desert
 Sahara desert
 South Saharan steppe and woodlands
 Tibesti-Jebel Uweinat montane xeric woodlands

Flooded grasslands and savannas
 Nile Delta flooded savanna
 Saharan halophytics

Freshwater ecoregions
 Dry Sahel
 Lower Nile
 Nile Delta
 Red Sea Coastal
 Temporary Maghreb

Marine ecoregions
 Levantine Sea
 Northern and Central Red Sea

References
 Burgess, Neil, Jennifer D’Amico Hales, Emma Underwood (2004). Terrestrial Ecoregions of Africa and Madagascar: A Conservation Assessment. Island Press, Washington DC.
 Spalding, Mark D., Helen E. Fox, Gerald R. Allen, Nick Davidson et al. "Marine Ecoregions of the World: A Bioregionalization of Coastal and Shelf Areas". Bioscience Vol. 57 No. 7, July/August 2007, pp. 573–583.
 Thieme, Michelle L. (2005). Freshwater Ecoregions of Africa and Madagascar: A Conservation Assessment. Island Press, Washington DC.

Egypt
Ecoregions